Geotrigona is a genus of bees belonging to the family Apidae.

The species of this genus are found in Southern America.

Species:

Geotrigona acapulconis 
Geotrigona aequinoctialis 
Geotrigona argentina 
Geotrigona chiriquiensis 
Geotrigona fulvatra 
Geotrigona fulvohirta 
Geotrigona fumipennis 
Geotrigona joearroyoi 
Geotrigona kaba 
Geotrigona kraussi 
Geotrigona kwyrakai 
Geotrigona leucogastra 
Geotrigona lutzi 
Geotrigona mattogrossensis 
Geotrigona mombuca 
Geotrigona subfulva 
Geotrigona subgrisea 
Geotrigona subnigra 
Geotrigona subterranea 
Geotrigona tellurica 
Geotrigona terricola 
Geotrigona xanthopoda

References

Meliponini